Tubificinae is a subfamily of annelids belonging to the family Naididae.

The following genera are assigned to Tubificinae:

 Baltidrilus Timm, 2013
 Christerius Holmquist, 1985
 Clitellio Savigny, 1822
 Ilyodrilus Eisen, 1879
 Isochaetides Hrabĕ, 1966
 Limnodrilus Claparède, 1862
 Potamothrix Vejdovský & Mrázek, 1903
 Tasserkidrilus Holmquist, 1985
 Telliclio Timm, 1978
 Tubifex Lamarck, 1816
 Tubificoides Lastočkin, 1937

References 

Naididae